Blue cairn circle is a  diameter stone circle in Aberdeenshire, Scotland. In the center is a large stone cairn with several pits in it.

See also 
 
 List of stone circles

References 

Stone circles in Aberdeenshire
Buildings and structures in Aberdeenshire
History of Aberdeenshire
Scheduled Ancient Monuments in Aberdeenshire